Palu'e Island (often referred to as Palu Island) is located north of Flores Island in the Flores Sea. It is part of Lesser Sunda Islands. Palu'e island is under the administrative region of Sikka regency of East Nusa Tenggara province, Indonesia.

The island has an area of 41 km² and population of 9,497 people (at the 2020 Census) in eight mountain villages. There are no roads or vehicles on the island. Palu'e can be reached from Maumere, a city in Flores, which takes six hours by wooden motorboat.

The language spoken on the island is the Polynesian language Paluwe.

Rokatenda (Paluweh) volcano is located in the northern region of Palu'e. The volcano erupted on August 10, 2013 and killed six people, three adults and three children.

References

See also
Palu'e language

Lesser Sunda Islands
Landforms of Flores Island (Indonesia)
Populated places in Indonesia
Islands of Indonesia